The 2006 Spengler Cup was held in Davos, Switzerland from December 26 to December 31, 2006. All matches were played at HC Davos' home arena, Eisstadion Davos. Brent Payne, a member of Modo played for Team Canada and scored a total of 7 points, including 4 goals and 3 assists.

Tournament Round-Robin results

All times local (CET; UTC +1)

Finals

Gallery

See also 
 Spengler Cup

External links 
Spengler Cup Official Site
TSN.ca Tournament Standings
Rogers SportsNet.ca Team Canada Roster (accessed 31-Dec-2006)

News articles
Rogers SportsNet: Pogge gaffe costs Canada Spengler Cup (Canadian Press) 31 December 2006 (accessed 31-Dec-2006)
Rogers SportsNet: Canada to face Davos in Spengler final (Canadian Press) 30 December 2006 (accessed 31-Dec-2006)
Rogers SportsNet: Spengler: Canada now facing must-win (Canadian Press) 29 December 2006 (accessed 31-Dec-2006)
Rogers SportsNet: Canada goes 2–0 at Spengler Cup (Canadian Press) 27 December 2006 (accessed 31-Dec-2006)
Rogers SportsNet: Quinn wins in Spengler debut (Canadian Press) 26 December 2006 (accessed 31-Dec-2006)
Rogers SportsNet: Canada adds two to Spengler roster (Canadian Press) 24 December 2006 (accessed 31-Dec-2006)

2006–07
2006–07 in Swiss ice hockey
2006–07 in Swedish ice hockey
2006–07 in Canadian ice hockey
2006–07 in German ice hockey
2006–07 in Russian ice hockey
December 2006 sports events in Europe